St Luke's Church, Stoke Bardolph is a parish church in the Church of England in Stoke Bardolph.

History

The church is built of plain brick dating from 1844, with alterations and extension to the chancel of 1910.

It is in a joint parish with two other churches:
Holy Trinity Church, Bulcote
St Helen's Church, Burton Joyce

Rev. Thomas Arnold Lee was born in 1889. He was a Durham graduate who had taught in schools in Cambridge, Singapore and Leeds; he had also served as a curate in Southwark Cathedral and at Leeds. During the First World War he had been a chaplain to HM Forces...in 1948 (he became) rector of Gedling with Stoke Bardolph (1948–57), and was made a canon of Southwell in 1955. He then retired to Buckinghamshire, where he was vicar of Grendon Underwood and Edgcott 1957–61. He died in 1972.

References

Church of England church buildings in Nottinghamshire